LLPS often involves sequence regions that have unique functional characteristics, as well as the presence of prion-like and RNA-binding domains. Nowadays there are just a few methods to predict the propensity of a protein to drive LLPS. The range of biological mechanisms involved in LLPS, the limited knowledge about these mechanisms and the important context-dependent component of LLPS make this problem challenging. In the last years, despite the advances in this field, just few predictors, specific for LLPS, have been developed, trying to understand the relationship between protein sequence properties and the capability to drive LLPS.  Here we will revise the state-of-the-art LLPS sequence-based predictors, briefly introducing them and explaining which are the individual protein characteristics that they identify in the context of LLPS.

LLPS Simulations 
Another important computational resource in the field of LLPS are the theoretic simulations of proteins, particularly Intrinsically disordered proteins (IDPs), driving LLPS. These simulations are complementary to the experiments and provide important insights about the molecular mechanisms of individual proteins driving LLPS. A review from Dignon et al. discussed how these simulations can be applied to interpret the experimental results, to explain the phase behavior and to provide predictive frameworks to design proteins with tunable phase transition properties. The challenge is the compromise between the resolution of the model and the computational efficiency, since all-atom simulations of big systems involving IDPs are still difficult to be performed. Moreover, the molecular interactions among IDPs in the droplet-state are still poorly understood, and the combination of experimental data and simulations are indispensable to elucidate them. Improvements in sampling and simulation methods might occur in the next few years, in order to enlighten these mechanisms.

See also 
Intrinsically disordered proteins

DisProt database

MobiDB database

References 

Protein structure
Structural bioinformatics
Proteomics
Neurodegenerative disorders